Melaleuca is a plant genus in the family Myrtaceae containing the paperbarks.

Melaleuca may also refer to:

Places 
 Melaleuca, Tasmania, south west Tasmania, Australia
 Melaleuca to Birchs Inlet Important Bird Area
 Melaleuca, Western Australia
 Melaleuca Field, minor league ballpark, Idaho, USA

Company 
 Melaleuca, Inc, a company headed by Frank L. VanderSloot

See also
Melanoleuca, a genus of fungi formerly known as Melaleuca